Batek is an Aslian language of Malaysia, spoken by the Batek people. The Mintil (Batek Tanum), Dèq and Nong dialects may be separate languages. The number of speakers is small and decreasing.

References

External links 
 http://projekt.ht.lu.se/rwaai RWAAI (Repository and Workspace for Austroasiatic Intangible Heritage)
 http://hdl.handle.net/10050/00-0000-0000-0003-66FE-9@view Batek in RWAAI Digital Archive

Languages of Malaysia
Aslian languages